Paik Haksoon is currently President of the Sejong Institute in South Korea.

Paik is a member of Board of Directors of the Kim Dae-jung Peace Center—the memorial center for the late South Korean President Kim Dae-jung (Kim Dae-jung), the Nobel Peace Prize laureate in 2000. He was formerly an advisor in various capacities to South Korea’s Ministry of Unification, Ministry of Foreign Affairs, and National Assembly. He was the executive director of the Seoul-Washington Forum, the Chairman of the Policy Committee of the Korea Council for Reconciliation and Cooperation, a news commentator for the Korean Broadcasting System (KBS), and a columnist for major Korean national newspapers. He was a Vice President of Korean Political Science Association and also a Vice President of the Korean Association of North Korean Studies.

Paik has written extensively on North Korean politics, inter-Korean relations, North Korea-U.S. relations, and North Korean nuclear and missile issues. He is author of numerous books and monographs written in Korean, including: Park Geun-hye Administration’s Policy on North Korea and Unification: Comparison with Previous Administrations (2018), North Korean Politics in the Kim Jong Un Era, 2012-2014: Ideas, Identities, and Structures (2015), The U.S.-North Korea Relations During President Obama's Second Term, 2013-2014: Threat of the Use of Nuclear Weapons and the Collapse of Relations (2014), The U.S.-North Korea Relations during President Obama’s First Term, 2009-2012 (2012), and The History of Power in North Korea: Ideas, Identities, and Structures (2010). Paik's most recent published articles and book chapters include: “Inside Kim Jong Un’s Assertive Mind” (2017) and “Kim Jong Un’s Leadership in Diplomacy, Security Affairs, and Unification” (2017). 

Paik earned his Ph.D. in political science from the University of Pennsylvania and was a post-doctoral fellow at the Korea Center of Harvard University.

References

External links
 Sejong Institute

Korean studies
Living people
1954 births